Calosoma gestroi is a species of ground beetle in the subfamily of Carabinae. It was described by Stephan von Breuning in 1928.

References

gestroi
Beetles described in 1928